Sarah Hogg, Viscountess Hailsham, Baroness Hogg, Baroness Hailsham of Kettlethorpe (born 14 May 1946) is an English economist, journalist, and politician. She was the first woman to chair a FTSE 100 company.

Biography
She was born Sarah Elizabeth Mary Boyd-Carpenter, her father being John Boyd-Carpenter, Baron Boyd-Carpenter, a former Chief Secretary to the Treasury and Paymaster-General. She attended Miss Ironside's School in Kensington. She then went to the Roman Catholic girls' boarding school St Mary's School Ascot. Later she attended Lady Margaret Hall at the University of Oxford where she read Philosophy, Politics and Economics (PPE). While at Oxford University, she edited Cherwell, the student newspaper.

Through her 1968 marriage to Member of Parliament Douglas Hogg, 3rd Viscount Hailsham, she is Viscountess Hailsham. However, following the granting of a life peerage in 1995, she is Baroness Hogg in her own right.

Career

Journalism
She was an economics editor for The Independent newspaper. She was also an early presenter of Channel 4 News, but her voice, with its uncertainty of pitch, was felt by many viewers to be a distraction. At this time she portrayed Margaret Thatcher in a television docudrama of negotiations between the UK and Irish governments.

Politics
Hogg was the head of the Prime Minister's Policy Unit for Sir John Major. With Jonathan Hopkin Hill, she wrote about the Major years in her book Too Close to Call.

In 1995, she was granted a life peerage and now sits as a crossbencher in the House of Lords as Baroness Hogg, of Kettlethorpe in the County of Lincolnshire.

Business
As Chairman of 3i Group from 2002, she became the first woman to chair a FTSE 100 company.
In 2010 she was appointed the Chairman of the Financial Reporting Council. She is also the chairman of Frontier Economics Limited. Other current and former board memberships include the Financial Conduct Authority, BG Group, the BBC, P&O Cruises, P&O Princess, and Eton College.

Personal life
Hogg is married to Douglas Hogg, 3rd Viscount Hailsham and together they have two children:

 Hon. Charlotte Mary Hogg (born 26 August 1970), previously in charge of retail operations at Santander UK, in 2013 she was appointed first Chief Operating Officer at the Bank of England, under Governor Mark Carney, and from March 2017, she served briefly as Deputy Governor (Markets and Banking) before resigning from both positions for failure to declare that her brother was employed in the banking industry.
 Hon. Quintin John Neil Martin Hogg (born 12 October 1973), heir apparent to the viscountcy

Other activities
She is a trustee of the school where she was educated and also a trustee of the charitable Trusthouse Foundation.

Titles
 Miss Sarah Boyd-Carpenter (1946–1968)
 The Hon. Mrs Douglas Hogg (1968–1972)
 The Hon. Mrs Hogg (1972–1995)
 The Rt Hon. The Baroness Hogg (1995–2001)
 The Rt Hon. The Baroness Hogg, Viscountess Hailsham (2001–)

Bibliography
Too Close to Call: John Major, Power and Politics in No.10 by Sarah Hogg & Jonathan Hill, Little, Brown (1995),

External links
 Baroness Hogg, TheyWorkForYou
 Profile: Baroness Hogg, FRC chairman, Accountancy Age, 23 September 2010

References

1946 births
3i Group people
Alumni of Lady Margaret Hall, Oxford
BBC Governors
British chairpersons of corporations
British economists
British women economists
British journalists
British viscountesses
British women in business
Crossbench life peers
Daughters of life peers
Fellows of Lady Margaret Hall, Oxford
Life peeresses created by Elizabeth II
ITN newsreaders and journalists
Living people
People educated at St Mary's School, Ascot
Place of birth missing (living people)
Women business executives
Sarah
Sarah
British women television journalists
Spouses of life peers
Hogg 3